Capilano University Exchange is a bus terminus for TransLink located on the campus of Capilano University in the District of North Vancouver, British Columbia, Canada.  Opened on February 9, 2009, the exchange's only connections are to West Vancouver (via the City of North Vancouver) and the nearby Phibbs Exchange, which are served by only 2 routes (routes 245 and 255). Route 245 is operated by Coast Mountain Bus Company, while route 255 is operated by West Vancouver Blue Bus.

Routes

See also
List of bus routes in Metro Vancouver

References

External links
Capilano University Exchange map (PDF file)

TransLink (British Columbia) bus stations